USS Argonne was a transport ship in the United States Navy during World War I.

Argonne was leased by the U.S. Navy from its owner and commissioned in Norfolk, Virginia. The steel-hulled single-screw freighter Argonne – built as Taifuku Maru No. 1, the lead ship in the Dai-ichi Taifuku Maru class, in 1916 at Kobe, Japan, by the Kawasaki Dockyards – was operated prior to World War I by the Argonne Steamship Co., of New York. While undergoing voyage repairs by the Newport News Shipbuilding and Dry Dock Co., in January 1918, Argonne received an armed guard.

Conversion to U.S. Navy needs 
She continued to carry cargo for Allied forces in Europe until 19 October 1918 when she was taken over at Norfolk, Virginia, by the U.S. Navy on a bare-ship basis for the U.S. Army account of the Naval Overseas Transportation Service (NOTS). She was then manned by the Navy and commissioned on the same day.

World War I Support 
On 18 November, a week after the armistice stilled the guns on the Western Front, Argonne sailed for France carrying commissary stores, mules, and horses, to Bordeaux, and returned to Norfolk from her only NOTS voyage on 17 December 1918.

Decommissioning 
On 30 January 1919, Argonne was decommissioned and turned over to the United States Shipping Board, which subsequently returned her to her original owner. Her name was simultaneously stricken from the Navy List.

The ship was sold to Compagnie Havraise Peninsulaire in 1922 and renamed Calonne.  It became the Italian Wally in 1934, and was scrapped in La Spezia in 1935.

References 

Transports of the United States Navy
1916 ships